Barbourville is a hamlet in Delaware County, New York, United States. It is located northeast of Stilesville on NY Route 8. The East Branch Cold Spring Creek flows south through the hamlet.

References

Geography of Delaware County, New York
Hamlets in Delaware County, New York
Hamlets in New York (state)